Psylliodes napi is a species of flea beetle in the family Chrysomelidae. It is found in Europe and Northern Asia (excluding China) and North America.

Subspecies
These two subspecies belong to the species Psylliodes napi:
 Psylliodes napi flavicornis Weise, 1883
 Psylliodes napi napi (Fabricius, 1792)

References

Further reading

External links

 

Alticini
Articles created by Qbugbot
Beetles described in 1792